In molecular biology, the XPG-I is a protein domain found on Xeroderma Pigmentosum Complementation Group G (XPG) protein. The XPG protein is an  endonuclease which repairs DNA damage caused by ultraviolet light (UV light). The XPG protein repairs DNA by a process called, Nucleotide excision repair. Mutations in the protein commonly cause Xeroderma Pigmentosum which often lead to skin cancer.

Function
The function of the internal XPG (XPG-I) domain contains many of cysteine and glutamate amino acid residues that are frequently found in various enzyme active sites, DNA nucleases. The I domain, together with the N-terminal forms the catalytic domain that contains the active site.

Mechanism
XPG cleaves the 5'-overhanging flap structure that is generated  when DNA polymerase encounters the 5'-end of a downstream Okazaki fragment. It has both 5'endo-/exonuclease and 5'-pseudo-Y-endonuclease activities. Cleaves the junction between single and double-stranded regions of flap DNA. The endonuclease binds 2 magnesium ions per subunit, which probably participate in the reaction catalyzed by the enzyme. May bind an additional third magnesium ion after substrate binding.

References

Protein families
Protein domains
DNA repair